Half the Blood of Brooklyn is a 2007 pulp-noir / horror novel by American writer Charlie Huston.  It is the third novel in the Joe Pitt Casebooks, following No Dominion.  The series follows the life of the New York vampyre Joe Pitt, who works sometimes as an enforcer for various vampyre factions in New York and sometimes as a sort of detective.

Plot summary

Characters

External links

 Author Charlie Huston's Official Website and Blog

2000s horror novels
2007 American novels
Contemporary fantasy novels
American horror novels
American thriller novels
American vampire novels
Novels set in Brooklyn
Del Rey books